This is a list of volleyball sports video games.

Volleyball (1972), Magnavox Odyssey; Magnavox
Volleyball! (1980), Magnavox Odyssey²; Magnavox
RealSports Volleyball (1982), Atari 2600; Atari, Inc.
Joshi Volleyball / Big Spikers (1983), Arcade; Taito
Spiker (1986), Arcade; Bally/Sente
Volleyball (1986), Famicom Disk System, NES; Nintendo
Volleyball Simulator (1986), Atari ST, IBM PC, Commodore 64, Amiga; Softgold 
Great Volleyball (1987), Master System; Sega
Arcade Volleyball (1988), IBM PC; COMPUTE!
Kings of the Beach (1988), NES, IBM PC, Commodore 64; Electronic Arts
Spiker! Super Pro Volleyball (1989), Intellivision; Realtime Associates
V'Ball - U.S. Championship Beach Volley (1989), X68000; Sharp
Super Volleyball (1989), Arcade, Genesis/Mega Drive, TurboGrafx 16/PC Engine; V-System Co.
Super Spike V'Ball (1990), NES; Technos
Malibu Bikini Volleyball / Seaside Volley (JP) (1990), Atari Lynx, Game Boy; Activision
Power Spikes (1991), Arcade, Neo Geo; Video System Co.
Venice Beach Volleyball (1991), NES; Idea-Tek
Sanrio Cup: Pon Pon Volley (1992), NES; Charactersoft
Hyper V-Ball (1992), SNES; McO'River, Video System
Dig & Spike Volleyball (1993), SNES; Hudson Soft, Tonkin House
ESPN Let's Play Beach Volleyball (1994), 3DO Interactive Multiplayer; Intelliplay
Popeye: Beach Volleyball (1994), Game Gear; Technōs Japan
Power Spikes II (1994), Arcade, Neo Geo CD; Video System Co.
Multi Play Volleyball (1994), SNES; Pack-in-Video
Virtual Volleyball (1995), Sega Saturn; Imagineer
World Beach Volley (1995), Arcade; Playmark
World Cup Volley '95 (1995), Arcade; Data East Corporation
Inazuma Serve da!! Super Beach Volley (1995), SNES; Virgin Interactive Entertainment
Beach Festival World Championship 1997 (1997), Arcade; Comad
Winning Spike (1997), Arcade; Konami
Waku Waku Volley (1998), PlayStation; (2003), PlayStation 2
Power Spike Pro Beach Volleyball Beach 'n Ball (EU) (2000), Game Boy Color, PlayStation, IBM PC; Infogrames
Beach Volleyball: Sea, smash and sun (2001), IBM PC; Carapace
Klonoa Beach Volleyball (2002), PlayStation; Namco
Beach Spikers (2002), Arcade / GameCube; Sega
Outlaw Volleyball (2003), Xbox; (2005), PlayStation 2; Simon & Schuster Interactive
Summer Heat Beach Volleyball (2003), PlayStation 2; Acclaim Entertainment
Dead or Alive Xtreme Beach Volleyball (2003), Xbox; Tecmo
Hamtaro: Ham-Ham Games (2004), Game Boy Advance; AlphaDream Corporation
Tom Goes to the Mayor: Idea Volleyball (2004), Windows Web-Based; Adult Swim Games
International Volleyball 2004 (2006), Windows; AddGames Italia
Dead or Alive Xtreme 2 (2006), Xbox 360; Tecmo
The Sports Daishuugou - Yakyuu-Tennis-Volleyball-Futsal-Golf (2007), Nintendo DS; Tamsoft
Big Beach Sports (2008), Wii; THQ
Women's Volleyball Championship / FIVB Volleyball World Cup: Venus Evolution (JP) (2008), PlayStation 2; Agetec
Boomerang Sports Vôlei (2009), Zeebo; Tectoy
International Volleyball 2009 (2009), Windows;
Dead or Alive Paradise (2010), PlayStation Portable; Tecmo
Mario Sports Mix (2010), Wii; Nintendo
Mario & Sonic at the London 2012 Olympic Games (2011), Nintendo 3DS, Wii; Nintendo
Okiraku Beach Volley 3D (2012), Nintendo 3DS; Arc System Works
Mario & Sonic at the Rio 2016 Olympic Games (2016), Nintendo 3DS, Wii U; Nintendo
Volleyball Unbound - Pro Beach Volleyball (2016), Windows; Great Boolean
Super Volley Blast (2018), Nintendo Switch, PlayStation 4, Xbox One, Windows 
Mario & Sonic at the Olympic Games Tokyo 2020 (2019), Nintendo Switch; Nintendo
Spike Volleyball (2019), PlayStation 4, Xbox One, Windows
The Spike (2020), Windows
Lactea Volleyball (2020), Windows
Spikair Volleyball (2022), Windows

See also

Volleyball
Sports game

Volleyball